Pinyonia is a genus of gall midges, insects in the family Cecidomyiidae. There is at least one described species in Pinyonia, P. edulicola.

References

Further reading

 
 
 
 
 

Cecidomyiinae
Articles created by Qbugbot
Cecidomyiidae genera